Mughal Serai, Doraha or Doraha Sarai is located at Doraha in Ludhiana District. Its popularly known as 'Mughal Caravan Serai'. This is often confused with this place as RDB fort (Serai Lashkari Khan). RDB fort, the fort shown in movie Rang De Basanti, is situated at 8-9 km distance from this.

History
Doraha Serai was built as Mughal caravan serais for supporting Mughal caravans, by the Mughal ruler Jahangir. Once an example of fine Mughal architecture, this historical serai is in a dilapidated condition due to indifferent attitude of the government.

Architecture 
The Mughal Serai covers an area of 168 sq.m imposing gateways right in the middle, southern and northern sides. The southern gate is beautifully decorated with flora and fauna paintings while the northern gate has well crafted floral designs. Both, northern and southern gates are connected to the 'Kaccha Pathway'. There are about 20 rooms on northern and southern sides while there are 30 rooms on the eastern and western sides. Also, there is a magnificent suite of 3 rooms. There are some areas which might have been used as 'Hammam' or bathing area in eastern parts of the majestic fort. There are many rooms specially designed for light and ventilation of air. The rooms are usually provided with slanting ventilators. The ceilings were painted with beautiful and lively colors, their traces can be seen in this royal but ruined fort. Also there is a mosque present on the western half, but now in ruins. It was painted in very lively colours. There is one-storeyed structure adjoining mosque which could be the Mullah's residence.

See also
Tourism in Punjab, India
Serai Lashkari Khan or RDB Fort

References

External links
@YouTube

Ludhiana district
Mughal caravanserais
Monuments and memorials in Punjab, India
Ruins in India
Buildings and structures in Punjab, India
Caravanserais in India